Juho Kusti Paasikivi's first senate was the second Senate and de facto Government of independent Finland. Its time period was May 27, 1918 – November 27, 1918.

Two members of the Finnish Party and the Swedish Party's Alexander Frey resigned from the Government in June 1918. The Agrarian League's two senators resigned in August 1918 because of Young Finnish Party's campaign of monarchy was very active. In November 1918, following the surrender of Germany and the end of World War I, the Parliament of Finland adopted the republican form of state and the Senate of Finland was abolished and substituted officially by the new Finnish Government.

Assembly 
The following table displays the Senate's composition:

References 

Political history of Finland
1918 establishments in Finland
1918 disestablishments in Finland